Alan Mack Site (38OR67) is a historic archaeological site located near Orangeburg, Orangeburg County, South Carolina. The site includes archaeological evidence of occupation during the Early, Middle, and Late Archaic; Early, Middle, and Late Woodland; and Mississippian periods.

It was added to the National Register of Historic Places in 1986.

References

Archaeological sites on the National Register of Historic Places in South Carolina
Buildings and structures in Orangeburg County, South Carolina
National Register of Historic Places in Orangeburg County, South Carolina